Rajapakse Mohottige Don Suranimala Rajapaksha (Sinhala:සුරනිමල රාජපක්ෂ) (5 January 1949 – 14 March 2016) was a Sri Lankan politician. Rajapaksha was first elected to the Parliament of Sri Lanka in 1994 and he was the Minister of School Education in Democratic Socialist Republic  of Sri Lanka in 2001 to 2004. He was a member of the United National Party (UNP) and a member of UNP Working Committee.
He was also appointed as the Coordinating secretary to the prime minister Ranil Wickremesinghe in 2015. At the time of his death he  acted as the special envoy (representative) to the Prime Minister. His younger son Kanishka Rajapaksha was also appointed as the Coordinating Assistant to the Prime Minister after the death of Rajapaksha. Kanishka is an Attorney at Law in his profession.

Early life

He was born to Saranelis Rajapaksha and D.P. Rajapaksha Hamine. His father was a well-respected land owner in the village of Samanabeddha, Thitthapatthara in Gampaha District. He was the youngest son in a family of three. In 1983 he married Chandani Jayakodi.

Education

Rajapaksha completed his primary education at Mayadunna Maha Vidyalaya and Rajasingha Maha Vidyalaya. He later entered Ananda College at Colombo to complete his secondary education.

Political career

Member of Youth League
In 1973 he was appointed as a working committee member in Youth League of the UNP. Ranil Wickremesinghe was the treasurer of the Youth League.

Minister of Provincial Council

With the 13th amendment to the constitution in 1988, government has established Provincial Councils for each province. First Provincial Council election was held in 1988 and Rajapaksha was elected as a member of Provincial Council representing Gampaha district.

Member of Parliament
In the 1994 general election, UNP lost to Chandrika Bandaranaike Kumaratunga's PA and she was appointed as the Prime Minister and soon after elected as the 5th executive President of the country. However, in 1994, Rajapaksha was elected as a member of parliament (MP) of opposition for the very first time at the general election.

Minister of School Education
 In 2001 UNP called for a general election after PA lost their vote of confidence in the Parliament. After 7 years, UNP defeated the PA at the 2001 general election and Ranil Wickremesinghe was appointed as the PM of Socialist Republic of Sri Lanka. Rajapaksha was re-elected to the Parliament in that election and he was appointed as the Minister of School Education in 2001.

Political controversy
In 2003, Rajapaksha who was a non-cabinet Education Minister would frequently undermine his senior Cabinet Minister Karunasena Kodituwakku resulting in a rift within the UNP. According to prominent Sri Lankan academic and political analyst Prof. Rajiva Wijesinha, Suranimala Rajapaksa, as Project Ministers of Education was exercising equal powers with Karunasena Kodituwakku who was in theory his superior leading to the party facing an internal conflict.

Domestic Airlines delay controversy
In March 2003, a domestic airline was delayed by two hours in Jaffna because non-cabinet minister for educational services, Suranimala Rajapakse, was lunching with a local MP. The British Broadcasting Corporation correspondent Frances Harrison reported that Elderly and sick passengers were loaded on to the aircraft with no air conditioning or refreshments and kept waiting while the minister then drank tea with the Jaffna security force commander at the airport.

Misappropriation of Public Property
Rajapaksha faced a humiliating loss of his Parliamentary seat during the 2004 General Elections. In 2007, the Attorney General's Department (Sri Lanka) initiated action against Rajapaksha for defaulting the payment of installments for the luxury vehicles obtained under the duty free facility provided for parliamentarians.The Attorney General's Department concluded that the Minister was being charged for misappropriation of Public Property, in which the accused is not entitled to appeal for bail.

Due to the controversy related to allegations of corruption surrounding Suranimala Rajapaksha, the UNP leadership did not nominate him to contest the 2010 general elections.

Arrest following political violence
Suranimala Rajapaksha along with several other UNP politicians were arrested for unleashing political violence on a protest march which resulted in several protesters being injured on October 5, 2013.

Matara Chief Magistrate and Additional District Judge Sarath Sisira Kumara later released Rajapaksha and his associates on a Rs. 100,000 personal bail each.

Coordinating Secretary to the Prime Minister
The common candidate of the joint opposition, Maithreepala Sirisena who secured a comprehensive victory on 8 January 2015 presidential election was sworn in as the 7th executive president of the Democratic Socialist Republic of Sri Lanka. Soon after, opposition leader Ranil Wickremesinghe was sworn in as the new Prime Minister in the presence of the president. Wickremesinghe later appointed him as the coordinating secretary to the Prime Minister on 27 January 2015.

Positions held at the end
Working Committee member of the United National Party
Secretary, Ex-Parliamentarian Group
Special envoy to the prime minister Ranil Wickremesinghe

Death
Rajapaksha died in the early hours of 14 March 2016 in Colombo, at the age of 67, he had been receiving treatment at a private hospital. He served as the special envoy to Ranil Wickremesinghe, the prime minister of Sri Lanka, for just over a year, at the time of his death.

See also
 List of Ananda College alumni

References

External links
https://web.archive.org/web/20041112213635/http://www.dailynews.lk/2002/08/24/new33.html
https://web.archive.org/web/20070507013521/http://www.dailynews.lk/2002/03/16/new05.html

1949 births
2016 deaths
Sri Lankan Buddhists
People from Western Province, Sri Lanka
Alumni of Ananda College
Sinhalese politicians
United National Party politicians
Provincial councillors of Sri Lanka
Education ministers of Sri Lanka
Members of the 10th Parliament of Sri Lanka
Members of the 11th Parliament of Sri Lanka
Members of the 12th Parliament of Sri Lanka
Government ministers of Sri Lanka
Non-cabinet ministers of Sri Lanka